The following is a list of Teen Choice Award winners and nominees for Choice Music - Collaboration. It was first introduced as Choice Music - Hook Up from 2002-2004 before being awarded under its current title in 2005. It was later given out under its original title from 2008-2010 before being retitled again in 2015.

Winners and nominees

2000s

2010s

References

Pop music awards
Collaboration
Musical collaboration awards